Virginie Delvingt (born 8 July 1971) is a French badminton player. She competed in women's singles and women's doubles at the 1992 Summer Olympics in Barcelona.

References

External links

1971 births
Living people
French female badminton players
Olympic badminton players of France
Badminton players at the 1992 Summer Olympics
Sportspeople from Strasbourg